Gregor MacKenzie Stevens (born 13 January 1955 in Drumchapel, Glasgow) is a Scottish former professional footballer, who played during the 1970s and 1980s.

Stevens started his career at Motherwell in 1974 and moved to Leicester City in 1979 for a fee of £165,000. But he was to stay there for only four months before being brought back to Scotland by Rangers manager John Greig who paid City £150,000 for his services.

Stevens' Rangers debut came on 6 September 1979 as a sub in a 4-2 win at Dundee United. He went on to make 92 appearances and scored four goals.

References

Sources

Gregor Stevens at Sportingheroes.net
Gregor Stevens at Londonhearts

1955 births
Brechin City F.C. players
Dumbarton F.C. players
Association football defenders
Heart of Midlothian F.C. players
Leicester City F.C. players
Living people
Motherwell F.C. players
Partick Thistle F.C. players
Rangers F.C. players
Scottish Football League players
Scottish footballers
English Football League players
Scottish Football League representative players
Scotland under-21 international footballers